Dharmatma Inter College is a college situated in Arrah, with its own reputation in adjacent areas and within the district of Bhojpur.

Universities and colleges in Bihar
Arrah
Educational institutions established in 1983
1983 establishments in Bihar